Semyon Isaakovich Kirsanov (in Odesa – 10 December 1972 in Moscow) was a Soviet and Russian poet and journalist. Still in his teens, Kirsanov was the organizing force in his native Odesa in 1921 behind the Southern Association of Futurists. In 1925, Vladimir Mayakovsky published two of his poems in his Constructivist journal LEF, having met the younger poet on a visit to Odesa. Upon moving to Moscow the same year, Kirsanov began an apprenticeship with Mayakovsky and the poet Nikolai Aseyev and, in the public imagination, inherited his mentor's torch after Mayakovsky's death in 1930. For a more complete biography, see Maxim D. Schrayer's An Anthology of Jewish-Russian Literature, Vol. 1.

External links
Kirsanov. Poems
English translations of 3 miniature poems
Biography in An Anthology of Jewish-Russian Literature, Vol. 1.
  Includes English translation of poem "The Letter M," (1935,) 142-143

1906 births
1972 deaths
20th-century pseudonymous writers
20th-century Russian male writers
20th-century Russian poets
Writers from Odesa
K. D. Ushinsky South Ukrainian National Pedagogical University alumni
Stalin Prize winners
Recipients of the Order of Lenin
Recipients of the Order of the Red Banner of Labour
Socialist realism writers
Russian male poets
Russian male writers
Soviet male poets
Soviet male writers
Deaths from cancer in Russia
Deaths from cancer in the Soviet Union
Deaths from laryngeal cancer
Burials at Novodevichy Cemetery